Philippe Le Bas (18 June 1794 in Paris – 19 May 1860 in Paris) was a French hellenist, archaeologist and translator. He was the son of Philippe Le Bas and Elisabeth Duplay, the daughter of Robespierre's landlord Maurice Duplay. He was only 6 weeks old when his father committed suicide on Robespierre's fall on 27 July 1794 in the Thermidorian Reaction.

Writers from Paris
1794 births
1860 deaths
French classical scholars
French archaeologists
German–French translators
French librarians
Academic staff of the École Normale Supérieure
Members of the Académie des Inscriptions et Belles-Lettres
French hellenists
French epigraphers
19th-century French translators
19th-century French male writers
French male non-fiction writers